Mark Dvorzhetski (3 May 1908 – 15 March 1975) was an Israeli physician, historian and Holocaust survivor.

Biography
Mark Dvortzhetski was born in Lithuania (at the time part of the Russian Empire). He immigrated  to Israel after World War II. He authored a number of books on the Holocaust, in particular with reference to the Baltic States and the medical profession.

Awards and recognition 
 In 1953, Dvorzhetski was awarded the Israel Prize, for social sciences, the inaugural year of the prize.

Published works 
Between the Pieces - an autobiography
Yerusholaym de-Lita in kamf un umkum. Zikhroynes fun Vilner Geto [Lutte et chute de la Jérusalem-de-Lithuanie. Histoire du Ghetto de Vilna], Paris, L’Union Populaire Juive en France 1948 (Jerusalem of Lithuania in Revolt and in the Holocaust – History of the Vilna Ghetto and the Resistance Movement)
Europe without Children: Nazi Plans for Biological Destruction
The Jewish Camps in Estonia
Hirshke Glik, Paris 1966

See also 
List of Israel Prize recipients

References 

Academic staff of Bar-Ilan University
Holocaust survivors
Israeli Ashkenazi Jews
20th-century Israeli physicians
Israel Prize in social sciences recipients
Israel Prize in social sciences recipients who were historians
Lithuanian Jews
Soviet emigrants to Israel
Israeli people of Lithuanian-Jewish descent
1908 births
1975 deaths
20th-century Israeli historians
Burials at Kiryat Shaul Cemetery